Charmaleh-ye Sofla (also Romanized as Charmaleh-ye Soflá; also known as Chalmala Pain, Chalmaleh Pāīn, Charmaleh, and Charmaleh-ye Pā‘īn) is a village in Bavaleh Rural District, in the Central District of Sonqor County, Kermanshah Province, Iran. At the 2006 census, its population was 861, in 193 families.

References 

Populated places in Sonqor County